Thierry Gathuessi (born 17 April 1982) is a retired Cameroonian footballer who plays as defender.

Career
Gathuessi joined Hibs from FC Sète in July 2007 following a successful trial period with the club. He scored his only goal for Hibs in a 3–2 win over defending SPL champions Celtic. Due to his aggressive playing style, Hibs fans referred to him as "Hong Kong Thierry", after the cartoon character Hong Kong Phooey.

Gathuessi fell out of favour at Hibs after he conceded two penalty kicks towards the end of the 2007–08 season. He did not play for Hibs in the 2008–09 season, having been told by Mixu Paatelainen during August 2008 that he would not play for Hibs again. Gathuessi was eventually released by Hibs to sign for Inverness Caledonian Thistle in January 2009, along with Filipe Morais. He only made one appearance for Inverness, however, before he was released at the end of the 2008–09 season.

Gathuessi had a trial spell with Raith Rovers in November 2009, appearing in a reserve team match and two league matches as a trialist. He then signed a contract with the Kirkcaldy club during the following month.

In January 2015, he was reported to have signed with Persiram.

Honours 
Sriwijaya
Winner
 Indonesia Super League: 2011–12

Arema Cronus
Winner
East Java Governor Cup: 2013

Winner
Menpora Cup: 2013

Winner
 Indonesian Inter Island Cup: 2014/15

Runner-up
 Indonesia Super League: 2013

References

External links 
 
 
  Profile and stats at L'Équipe
 

1982 births
Living people
People from Bafoussam
Association football defenders
Cameroonian footballers
Cameroon international footballers
French footballers
Montpellier HSC players
AS Cannes players
FC Sète 34 players
Hibernian F.C. players
Inverness Caledonian Thistle F.C. players
Raith Rovers F.C. players
Ligue 1 players
Ligue 2 players
Scottish Premier League players
Scottish Football League players
Cameroonian expatriate footballers
Expatriate footballers in France
Expatriate footballers in Scotland
French sportspeople of Cameroonian descent
Expatriate footballers in Indonesia
Liga 1 (Indonesia) players
Sriwijaya F.C. players
Arema F.C. players
Cameroonian expatriate sportspeople in Indonesia